Hồng Bàng is a district (quận) of Haiphong, the third-largest city of Vietnam. The Hai Phong City Committee, the local administrative office, is located on Hoàng Diệu street, in the east of the district.

Administrative divisions
Hồng Bàng district is subdivided into 9 wards:
Hạ Lý
Hoàng Văn Thụ
Hùng Vương
Minh Khai
Phan Bội Châu
Quán Toan
Sở Dầu
Thượng Lý
Trại Chuối

References

Districts of Haiphong